Jack Snyder may refer to:

 Jack Snyder (As the World Turns), fictional character in the TV series As the World Turns
 Jack Snyder (political scientist) (born 1951), American academic
 Jack Snyder (baseball) (1886–1981), American baseball player

See also
 John Snyder (disambiguation) 
 Jack Schneider (1883–1958), American college football player and coach